International Match (Swedish: Landskamp) is a 1932 Swedish drama film directed by Gunnar Skoglund and starring Georg Blomstedt, Fritiof Billquist and Olof Sandborg. It was shot at the Råsunda Studios in Stockholm and on location in the city. The film's sets were designed by the art director Arne Åkermark. Future star Ingrid Bergman made her screen debut in the film as an extra, appearing as a girl waiting in a queue.

Synopsis
Erik, the son of a farmer, gets engaged to Brita a shop assistant. At his engagement party he ends up getting drunk. When a policeman is then stabbed with his knife, he is suspect but eventually cleared of any crime. However his father is so ashamed that he sells his farm and moves the family to Stockholm. There both Erik and his father struggle to find work, but eventually the son's athletic prowess allows him to get a job in a department store. His relationship with Brita becomes more distant, while his father himself becomes increasingly alcoholic and attempts suicide. at last Brita has a change of heart and helps Erik's father recover some money that had been stolen and buy back his farm and return to a life of sobriety.

Cast
 Georg Blomstedt as Lars Erik Andersson
 Signe Lundberg-Settergren as 	Stina Andersson
 Fritiof Billquist as 	Erik Andersson
 Gun Holmqvist as 	Brita Blomstedt
 Olof Sandborg as 	Mr. Andelius
 Håkan Westergren as 	Otto Andelius
 Signhild Björkman as 	Karin Lind
 Nils Jacobsson as 	Wilhelm Bergstedt
 Arne Borg as Roffe Ek
 Jenny Tschernichin-Larsson as 	Mrs. Holmgren
 Emil Fjellström as 	Bootlegger
 Hjalmar Peters as 	Ruben Lindqvist
 Ragnar Falck as 	Pelle Björk
 Sigge Fürst as 	Police officer
 Holger Löwenadler as 	District Judge
 Georg Rydeberg as 	District-court recording clerk
 Concordia Selander as 	Fru Holmgren
 Olga Andersson as 	Andelius' wife
 Mona Geijer-Falkner as 	Buffet Manageress
 Eric Gustafson as 	Coach 
 Gunnar Björnstrand as Student
 Carl Reinholdz as 	Tall Student
 Georg Skarstedt as Party Guest
 Ludde Juberg as Party Guest
 Helga Brofeldt as Party Guest
 Edla Rothgardt as 	Lady outside Store
 Ulla Billquist as Singer at Restaurant 
 Ingrid Bergman as 	Girl Waiting in Line

References

Bibliography 
 Qvist, Per Olov & von Bagh, Peter. Guide to the Cinema of Sweden and Finland. Greenwood Publishing Group, 2000.

External links 
 

1932 films
Swedish drama films
1932 drama films
1930s Swedish-language films
Films directed by Gunnar Skoglund
Films set in Stockholm
Films shot in Stockholm
1930s Swedish films